Cyclophora lateritica is a moth in the family Geometridae. It is found in New Caledonia.

The larvae have been reared on Codia species.

References

Moths described in 1979
Cyclophora (moth)
Moths of Oceania